The Choir is an American dramedy web series created by Issa Rae for the "faith and family focused" YouTube channel "Alright TV". The series, which premiered on YouTube on August 29, 2013, is "a comedic series about the personal, spiritual and often controversial dynamics of a revered church choir". Evette Dionne, writing for Bustle, counted The Choir among the "5 Best Web Series for People of Color" in December 2013.

Plot 
The series follows the group of African-American choir members in the United Church of Holy Christ in Fellowship, whose declining congregation forces the group to try to come up with a plan to survive. In the course of the drama, romance, intrigue, and political dealings throughout the story, the series explores the everyday life and nuances of the black church, and the relatable human struggles and experiences of its members. 

In the first episode, the choir performs a gospel version of Janet Jackson's "Any Time, Any Place"; Jessie, the young lead singer, decides to "sex up" the performance, to the consternation of some of the congregation, other choir members, and the pastor.

Characters and cast
 Yutopia Essex as Jessie, the lead singer in the choir
 D.K. Uzoukwu as James, Jessie's brother
 Idara Victor (Season 1) and Camille Winbush (Season 2) as Miriam, a young woman in the choir
 Alfred "A.J." Jackson as Myron, the choir director
 Lyne Odums as Ms. Debra, a pious older woman in the choir 
 Chauncey Jenkins as Caleb, a young man in the choir
 Lanre Idewu as Charles, Ms. Debra's son

References

External links
 

 The Choir Video Playlist on YouTube

2013 web series debuts
American comedy web series
American drama web series
2010s YouTube series